
The women's long jump event at the 2007 World Championships in Athletics took place on August 27, 2007 (qualification) and August 28, 2007 (final) at the Nagai Stadium in Osaka, Japan.

Medallists

Records

Results

Final

Qualification
Qualification standard 6.75m or at least best 12 qualified.

Group A

Group B

References
Official results, qualification - IAAF.org
Official results, final - IAAF.org

Long jump
Long jump at the World Athletics Championships
2007 in women's athletics